Borovichsky Uyezd (Боровичский уезд) was one of the subdivisions of the Novgorod Governorate of the Russian Empire. It was situated in the southcentral part of the governorate. Its administrative centre was Borovichi.

Demographics
At the time of the Russian Empire Census of 1897, Borovichsky Uyezd had a population of 146,368. Of these, 98.4% spoke Russian, 0.7% Karelian, 0.2% German, 0.1% Polish, 0.1% Yiddish, 0.1% Estonian and 0.1% Latvian as their native language.

References

 
Uezds of Novgorod Governorate
Novgorod Governorate